Rachel Farley (born March 28, 1995 in Lawrenceville, Georgia, United States)  is an American country music singer.

At age 13, Farley began opening for Brantley Gilbert. She also sang background vocals on Gilbert's 2012 single "Kick It in the Sticks".

She signed with Red Bow, a partnership of Broken Bow Records and RED Distribution, in 2012. Red Bow released her debut single, "Ain't Easy", in early 2013. Billy Dukes from Taste of Country gave the single a 3-star rating out of 5, saying that it "doesn't quite separate itself from the pack" but that it "will no doubt work as a live anthem". Ashley Cooke of Roughstock rated it 5 out of 5, saying that "There’s room for a new young female artist in Country Music and with her sassy, confident sound and rebellious demeanor, Farley may just have claimed that spot."

"Ain't Easy" was a minor Top 40 hit on the Billboard Country Airplay charts, reaching a peak of number 36. It was followed by "Midnight Road" later in 2013, which failed to chart, and Farley subsequently parted ways with Red Bow.

Discography

Singles

References

1995 births
American country singer-songwriters
American women country singers
BBR Music Group artists
Living people
Country musicians from Georgia (U.S. state)
People from Lawrenceville, Georgia
21st-century American singers
21st-century American women singers
Singer-songwriters from Georgia (U.S. state)